Strassmann is a German surname. Notable people with the surname include:

Antonie Strassmann, German stage actress and aviator
Diana Strassmann, American economist
Fritz Strassmann, German chemist
19136 Strassmann asteroid 
Joan E. Strassmann Biologist
Reinhold Strassmann, German mathematician
Strassmann's theorem
Wolfgang Straßmann, German politician

German-language surnames